Cameron Bain Laurenson (born 28 April 1998) is a South African water polo player. He competed in the 2020 Summer Olympics, held July–August 2021 in Tokyo.

References

1998 births
Living people
South African male water polo players
Olympic water polo players of South Africa
Water polo players at the 2020 Summer Olympics
Sportspeople from Cape Town